Oleksandr Vasylyovych Stadnik (born 7 July 1977) is a Ukrainian civil servant and politician. He was Governor of Mykolaiv Oblast from September 2019 to November 2020.

Biography 
In 2006 Stadnik graduated from the National Academy of Internal Affairs.

Stadnik is a lawyer by profession.

He worked at the Ministry of Revenues and Duties.

He also served at the State Fiscal Service in Kyiv.

In 2015, Stadnik ran for the Kyiv City Council.

Stadnik was appointed Governor of Mykolaiv Oblast on 18 September 2019. He was fired from this post on 17 November 2020.

References

External links 
 

1977 births
Living people
People from Kirovohrad Oblast
Ukrainian civil servants
Governors of Mykolaiv Oblast
21st-century Ukrainian lawyers
21st-century Ukrainian politicians
Independent politicians in Ukraine